This article shows the rosters of all participating teams at the women's water polo tournament at the 2015 Pan American Games in Toronto. Rosters can have a maximum of 13 athletes.

Argentina's team roster:

Camila Bertaina
Tatiana Canton
Carla Comba
Mariela de Virgilio
Rocio de Virgilio
Rocio Fesembeck
Laura Font
Dana Lea Gerschcovsky
Federica Gomez de la Canal
Ashley Hatcher
Florencia Magraht
Maria Olivieri
Manuela Tamagnone Werbach

Brazil announced their squad on April 16, 2015.

Catherine Oliveira
Diana Abla
Gabriela Dias
Izabella Chiappini
Lucianne Maia
Luiza Carvalho
Marina Zablith
Marina Canetti
Melani Dias
Mirella Coutinho
Tess Oliveira
Victória Chamorro
Viviane Bahia

Canada announced their squad on May 28, 2015.

Krystina Alogbo
Joëlle Békhazi
Carmen Eggens
Monika Eggens
Shae Fournier
Jessica Gaudreault
Jakie Kohli
Katrina Monton
Dominique Perreault
Christine Robinson
Stephanie Valin
Claire Wright
Emma Wright

Cuba's team roster:

Mairelis Zunzunegui
Dalia Grau
Yeliana Bravo
Thaimi Gonzalez
Adriana Garlobo
Mayelin Bernal
Yanet Lopez
Maviel Mendiola
Dayana Morales
Yordanka Pujol
Cecilia Diaz
Gertrudis Ortiz
Arisney Ramos

Mexico's team roster:

Adelina Alanis
Alicione Murrieta
Regina Ponce
Edith Flores
Marcela Rios
Maria Torres
Lorena Sanchez
Diana Carballo
Guadalupe Perez
Ivana Castro
Nydia Morales
Carina Carballo
Martha Espadas

The following was the Puerto Rico women's water polo team for the 2015 Pan American Games.

Angelik Alicea
Nichole Colon
Guarina Garcia
Maria Gutierrez
Carolin Matos
Paola Medina
Alejandra Ortiz
Amanda Ortiz
Cristina Ortiz
Osmarie Quinones
Anaid Ralat
Perla Del Mar Roman
Mairim Rosario

United States' team roster:

Samantha Hill
Madeline Musselman
Melissa Seidemann
Rachel Fattal
Caroline Clark
Margaret Steffens
Courtney Mathewson
Kiley Neushul
Ashley Grossman
Kaleigh Gilchrist
Makenzie Fischer
Kameryn Craig
Ashleigh Johnson

Venezuela's team roster:

Lorena Godoy Nadales
Nibley Piña Tovar
Dulce Hernandez Cabrera
Samantha Torres Granda
Ana Balsero Riveros
Marian Blanco Zambrano
Rocio Galue Bolivar
Franyelis Escalona Herrera
Yineldy Araujo Marin
Beatriz Escobar Abreu
Orian Rolfo Coronel
Jeisnaimil Agelvis
Angela Calvo Marcano

References

Women
2015